Piedra is a hair disease caused by a fungus, which causes formation of nodules on the hair shaft.

Types include:
 White piedra
 Black piedra

References

External links 

Mycosis-related cutaneous conditions
Animal fungal diseases
Human hair